Benten is another name for the Japanese Buddhist goddess Benzaiten.

Benten may also refer to:

Benten, a character in the manga series Urusei Yatsura
Benten Botan, a Japanese manga series
Benten Daiba, a fortress in the Republic of Ezo (1868–1869)
Benten Island, an island in Antarctica
Benten Kozō, a Japanese play
Benten Kozō (1958 film)
Benten-dō, a Buddhist temple dedicated to Benten or Benzaiten
Benten-jima (Wakkanai), a deserted island in Hokkaidō, Japan
Muhammad Saleh Benten, a Saudi politician
R. Anthony Benten, vice president and treasurer of The New York Times Company
Ben 10, an American media franchise